Dhubri port  is an important river port in Assam. This port is located in Dhubri  town on the banks of the Brahmaputra River. This port is located on the National Waterway 2. It is important for port terminal. It is located near the Bangladesh  border at the western end of National Waterway 2.

Location 
Dhubri Port or Jetty is located in Dhubri town on the north bank of the Brahmaputra River.

History
Dhubri port is a very old river port. This port is an important part of the economy of Dhubri and its adjoining areas. From the time of the British rule, this port was connected to the port of Kolkata with the water route. Jute and rice from Dumbari port were sent to the Port of Kolkata. After the country's independence, the Jamuna and Sundarban rivers fall between Pakistan and later Bangladesh. However, now between the two countries, ships and small vessels are carrying goods between Kolkata and Dhubri port.

RORO

Port has a roll-on/roll-off (RORO) ferry service with 1 low draft vessel operated on National Waterway 2 (NW2) by Inland Waterways Authority of India (IWAR) with capacity of 200 passenger, 4 cars and 2 trucks.

See also 
 Inland waterways of India
 Pandu Port

References

Ports and harbours of Assam
Transport in Assam
River ports of India
Transport in Dhubri